In mathematics, a Lawvere–Tierney topology is an analog of a Grothendieck topology for an arbitrary topos, used to construct a topos of sheaves. A Lawvere–Tierney topology is also sometimes also called a local operator or coverage or topology or geometric modality.

Definition

If E is a topos, then a topology on E is a morphism j from the subobject classifier Ω to Ω such that j preserves truth, preserves intersections, and is idempotent.

j-closure

Some theorems related to j-closure are (for some subobjects s and w of A):
 inflationary property: 
 idempotence: 
 preservation of intersections: 
 preservation of order: 
 stability under pullback: .

Examples

Grothendieck topologies on a small category C are essentially the same as Lawvere–Tierney topologies on the topos of presheaves of sets over C.

References

 
 

Topos theory
Closure operators